David Boldery is an Australian Paralympic lawn bowls player.  At the 1984 New York/Stoke Mandeville Games, he won a bronze medal in the Men's Singles A2/4 event. At the 1988 Seoul Games, he won a silver medal in the Men's Pairs LB2 event with Clifford Swann.

References

Paralympic lawn bowls players of Australia
Australian male bowls players
Lawn bowls players at the 1984 Summer Paralympics
Lawn bowls players at the 1988 Summer Paralympics
Medalists at the 1984 Summer Paralympics
Medalists at the 1988 Summer Paralympics
Amputee category Paralympic competitors
Paralympic silver medalists for Australia
Paralympic bronze medalists for Australia
Paralympic medalists in lawn bowls
Year of birth missing (living people)
Living people